Litcham is a village and civil parish in the English county of Norfolk. The village is located on the B1145 a route which runs between King's Lynn and Mundesley.

For the purposes of local government, the parish falls within the district of Breckland.

Litcham is in the Launditch hundred of the Breckland district of Norfolk, England. It is almost equidistant from three major market towns: East Dereham, Fakenham and Swaffham.

The Bull Inn is a 17th-century coaching inn with parts dating back to the 14th century. It is the one surviving of many pubs once serving the village.

The village has all the necessary amenities such as a post office, butchers, church, Methodist chapel, bus garage, fish and chip shop and health centre.

History
The villages name means 'Enclosure homestead/village' or 'hemmed-in land with an enclosure'.

Litcham is mentioned in the Domesday Book under the name Licham, Lecham or Leccham as 'a Market Town in the centre of Norfolk'. Other known spellings are Lucham, Lycham, Luychesham to mention but a few.

Edward I granted Litcham the right to hold a weekly market, but it did not thrive and had ceased by 1836. However it has left its mark on the layout of Litcham and is probably the reason why Church Street widens out so dramatically just below All Saints Church.

In Elizabethan times the village was the centre of the local tanning industry. The Collinson and Hallcottis families made considerable fortunes and became country squires. The Hallcottis' were local benefactors, building almshouses and paying for a church bell. Mathew Hallcottis is shown on the village sign with his tanning equipment.

In 1831 its population reached 771; more than a third of these were agricultural workers.

In 1977 it was designated a conservation village and boasts eleven listed buildings plus a church and priory that date back to the 12th century. The village sits astride a major crossroads of country lanes, the most important of which is the B1145 which stretches between King's Lynn and Norwich and was once the King's Lynn - Norwich - Great Yarmouth stagecoach route. Horses would have been changed at the 17th-century Bull Inn, which also served as the local law court until the late 18th century. On the green in front of the Bull Inn there once stood a row of old cottages and a chapel, which were demolished in 1968.

All Saints Church
Litcham is served by All Saints church in the Benefice of Litcham. The square tower was largely rebuilt in the early 15th century. The clock is dated 1725 and was made by the Swaffham blacksmith. The tower contains a peal of six bells, which are still rung today by the Litcham Bellringers. The unusual red and green painted rood screen was completed in 1536 and shows twenty-two painted images of saints. The tracery of the upper portions of the screen are carved with great delicacy. The female saints can be identified as Sitha, Cecilia, Dorothy, Juliana, Agnes, Petronella, Helena, and Ursula. The baptismal font is of the early 15th century and shows shields, now stripped of their identifying painted arms, on the bowl. The church also contains a wooden Dutch coffer, of which there are only five in the country, this used to be used for storing books. Also none of the faces on the statues have been erased unlike in other churches of the area.

There is also a Methodist Chapel, built in 1909, on Front Street.

Litcham Common
Litcham Common is situated the south of the village and is a managed nature reserve consisting of 28 hectares of lowland heath and mixed woodlands. The Nar Valley Way long-distance footpath runs across the common, is never far from the river, and offers a variety of scenery along the country lanes and tracks. The path follows farm tracks through Lexham Estate; at each end it passes through commons managed as nature reserves at Litcham and Castle Acre. A Bronze Age burial mound or tumulus was discovered on the common and Roman settlements and roads have been found just outside the village.

Grazing Scheme :
In 2006 Litcham Common Management Committee put forward proposals to introduce grazing which is recommended as by far the best way of preserving this type of habitat.  The Management Committee submitted a formal application to the Secretary of State for the erection of stock proof fencing which was approved on 12 February 2007. Fencing was erected in May 2008 and four semi-feral Dartmoor ponies arrived in June 2008. The common is divided in two by the Dunham Road and the ponies currently only graze the western half there are now plans to install cattle grids on the Dunham Road to allow the ponies to graze the whole of the common.

References

http://kepn.nottingham.ac.uk/map/place/Norfolk/Litcham

Villages in Norfolk
Civil parishes in Norfolk
Breckland District